The Aotearoa Music Awards (previously called the New Zealand Music Awards), conferred annually by Recorded Music NZ, honour outstanding artistic and technical achievements in the recording industry. The awards are among the most significant that a group or artist can receive in New Zealand music, and have been presented annually since 1965. The awards show is presented by Recorded Music NZ. A range of award sponsors and media partners support the event each year.

History and overview

The first awards for New Zealand recorded music were the Loxene Golden Disc awards, launched in 1965. The awards were created by soap powder manufacturer Reckitt & Colman's advertising agency, with support from the New Zealand Broadcasting Corporation (NZBC), the New Zealand Federation of Phonographic Industries and the Australasian Performing Rights Society (APRA), with the awards named after Reckitt & Colman's anti-dandruff shampoo, Loxene.

While initially only one prize was given, other awards were added, including categories for record cover, recording artist of the year, and a producer award. From 1970, two awards were given - one to a solo artist, the other to a group however there was still just one supreme award, selected from these two.

The Loxene Golden Disc awards continued until 1972 when the New Zealand Federation of Phonographic Industry decided to institute its own system; these awards became known as the Recording Arts Talent Awards (RATA). From 1978 the awards became known as the RIANZ Awards after the NZFPI changed its name to the Recording Industry Association of New Zealand (RIANZ).

In 1996 and 1997 the awards were merged with the Entertainer of the Year Awards and were known as the Clear Music and Entertainment Awards, sponsored by Clear Communications. From 1998 the awards reverted to music only, with the name going back to the New Zealand Music Awards and the award trophy nicknamed the Tui. Also in 1999 Coca-Cola New Zealand became the naming rights sponsor of the awards, known as the Coca-Cola New Zealand Music Awards for one year only.

Since 2004, the show's principal sponsor has been Vodafone New Zealand. With Vodafone's sponsorship, the awards became known as the Vodafone New Zealand Music Awards (VNZMA's).

In 2008 the awards ceremony moved to Vector Arena in Auckland, New Zealand. Prior to this move the event was primarily invitation only, and the increased size of the Vector Arena enabled the event to be attended both by invitation and by the public through sale tickets. While the Loxene Golden Disc award was televised in the 1970s, broadcasting of the contemporary award ceremony started in 2004.

In 2020, the awards were renamed the Aotearoa Music Awards.

New Zealand Music Hall of Fame

Created in 2007 in conjunction with the Australasian Performing Right Association (APRA), the New Zealand Music Hall of Fame pays tribute to those who have "shaped, influenced and advanced popular music in New Zealand." Two musicians or groups are inducted into the hall each year, one at the APRA Silver Scroll Awards, decided by APRA, and the other is the winner of the Legacy Award at the Aotearoa Music Awards, selected by Recorded Music NZ.

Critics Choice award

Awarded from 2010 until 2016, the Critics' Choice Prize was given to artists who were expected to be successful in the music industry in the future. To be eligible for the award, an artist must have neither released a studio album nor have been nominated for a New Zealand  Music Award in the past.

List of ceremonies

Winners by year

1965-1972

1973-1976

1978-current

 Album of the Year
 Single of the Year
 Best Group
 Best Solo Artist
 Breakthrough Artist of the Year
 Best Alternative Artist
 Best Children's Album
 Best Classical Artist
 Best Country Album
 Best Electronic Artist

 Best Folk Album
 Best Hip Hop Artist and Best Soul/RnB Artist
 Best Jazz Album
 Best Māori Artist
 Best Pacific Music Album
 Best Pop Artist
 Best Rock Artist
 Best Roots Artist
 Best Soul/RnB Artist
 Best Worship Artist

 Highest Selling New Zealand Artist
 Radio Airplay Record of the Year
 International Achievement
 People's Choice Award
 Critics' Choice Prize
 Legacy Award

 Artisan Awards
 Best Album Cover
 Best Music Video
 Best Engineer
 Best Producer

References
 For The Record: a history of the recording industry in New Zealand, B. Staff & S. Ashley, David Bateman, Auckland, 2002,

External links
NZ Music Awards website
AudioCulture Loxene Golden Disc history
AudioCulture Music Awards History

 
Music Awards, New Zealand
New Zealand music awards